Polisportiva Viribus Unitis is an Italian association football club located in Somma Vesuviana, Campania. It currently plays in Eccellenza.

History
The club was founded during 1917 in Somma Vesuviana (which lies within the Province of Naples), north of Mount Vesuvius). The club was affiliated in 1919 and took its name from the ship SMS Viribus Unitis with Riccardo Angrisani as its first president. The founders of the club were:

The commissioners for Virbus were Vincenzo Bianco and Gioacchino Mosca. At the time, the club was a multi-sports one: as well as playing football it competed in cycling, marathon running and general athletics.

In 1989 Viribus was merged with Polisportiva Somma.

In the season 2011–12 it was relegated to Eccellenza.

Colors and badge
Its colors are red and blue.

Honours
Eccellenza Campania
Champions: 1997–98
Promozione
Champions: 1996–97

References

External links
 Official homepage

Football clubs in Campania
Association football clubs established in 1917
1917 establishments in Italy